William of Jülich, called the Younger (Dutch: Willem van Gulik de Jongere; died August 18, 1304), was one of the Flemish noblemen that opposed the annexation policies of the French king Philip IV, together with Pieter de Coninck.

He was also archdeacon of the prince-bishopric of Liège. William was the son of William the Elder and grandson of William IV, Count of Jülich, and of Maria, a daughter of Guy of Dampierre, Count of Flanders and Matilda of Bethune. An extra incentive for this support could have been the murder of his uncle Walram, Count of Jülich by the French after the Battle of Bulskamp in 1297. The Flemish resistance led to the unexpected victory over the French during the Battle of the Golden Spurs in 1302. William of Jülich gained another victory against the French in the Battle of Arques (1303).

In 1304 however, the French king returned with an army and defeated the Flemings during the Battle of Mons-en-Pévèle. William died during this battle.

References

1304 deaths
Flemish nobility
Revolts involving Flanders
Year of birth unknown
Military personnel of the Holy Roman Empire
14th-century people from the county of Flanders